is a former Japanese football player.

Playing career
Kiichi Tomori played for J3 League club; FC Ryukyu from 2014 to 2015.

References

External links

1991 births
Living people
Kansai University of International Studies alumni
Association football people from Okinawa Prefecture
Japanese footballers
J3 League players
FC Ryukyu players
Association football midfielders